Edward John Turner (20 December 1921 – 23 September 1981) was an Australian rules footballer who played with  in the Victorian Football League and for Brighton in the Victorian Football Association in the 1940s and 1950s.

Family

The son of William Hector "Wally" Turner (1891-1949), a veteran of English and Irish descent,  and Emily Maria Turner (1889-1966), née Graham, née Phelan, also of English and Irish descent, with ancestors living in Tasmania as early as the 1820s, Edward John Charles Turner was born at Elsternwick, Victoria, on 20 December 1921. He was the youngest of their 5 children.

Marriage
After returning from the European front in 1944, he married Nellie Ann Casey (1923-2014), in 1944 at St Aloysius Catholic Church. Nellie, like Edward, was of a mix of Irish and English heritage. Her father was well-known horse trainer Sylvester Patrick Casey (1866-1950); and, through her mother's maternal grandmother, Eleanor Kate Thickins, née Beardmore, is related to British Industrialist William Beardmore, the major figure in engineering and shipbuilding who was later given the title of Lord Invernairn.

The couple had six children together, William (1945-), John (1948-), Maureen (1951-), Helen (1958-), Patricia (1960-) and Edward (1965-).

Football
A centre half back, Turner made his League debut for  during 1944. He played at North Melbourne until 1946, and played a total of sixteen senior games.

In 1947, he crossed to the Victorian Football Association and played for the Brighton Football Club until 1951. He was a member of Brighton's 1948 premiership team.

In 1952, Turner moved to the Frankston Football Club in the Mornington Peninsula Football League, where he served as captain-coach in 1952 and 1953.

He returned to Brighton as captain-coach in the VFA in 1954, and won the J. J. Liston Trophy as VFA best and fairest, winning by a margin of eight votes. He played with Brighton until 1955.

Later life
After his football career, he worked as a plumber and a gas fitter.

Death
He died suddenly at Frankston, Victoria on 23 September 1981, of heart related issues likely caused by his experiences during the war. He was outlived by his wife, 6 children and his grandchildren.

Notes

References
 
 World War Two Nominal Roll: Sergeant Edward John Turner (VX43546), Department of Veterans' Affairs.

External links
 
 
 E.J. "Ted" Turner, at The VFA Project.

1981 deaths
1921 births
North Melbourne Football Club players
Brighton Football Club players
Brighton Football Club coaches
J. J. Liston Trophy winners
Frankston Bombers players
Australian rules footballers from Melbourne
People from Elsternwick, Victoria
Australian military personnel of World War II
Australian people of English descent
Australian people of Irish descent
Military personnel from Melbourne